East Greenwich Pleasaunce is a public park in East Greenwich, in south-east London. It is situated to the north side of the railway line between Maze Hill and Westcombe Park railway stations and south of the A206 Woolwich Road.

The park, opened in 1857, was originally the graveyard of Greenwich Hospital. Due to construction of a railway tunnel as part of the London and Greenwich Railway, the remains of around 3000 sailors and officers, including those who fought in the Battle of Trafalgar and the Crimean War were removed from the hospital site in 1875 and reinterred in the Pleasaunce (named after the former Royal Palace of Placentia or Palace of Pleasaunce).

Those buried in the Pleasaunce include:
 Lieutenant James Berry (d. 1930), Curator of the Royal Naval Museum for 17 years
 John Booth (1781–1858). Born Northowram, West Yorkshire. Served at the Battle of Trafalgar as a Royal Marine in HMS Revenge. In July 1852 became a Greenwich Hospital in-pensioner.
 John Davidson (d. 1881), surgeon, Inspector-General of the Royal Navy, and Honorary Physician to Queen Victoria.
 Sir John Liddell (d. 1868), Director-General of the Medical Department of the Royal Navy (1855–1864)
 Anthony Sampayo, French Ambassador to England
 James Shepherd (d. 1907) for 18 years Queen Victoria's boatswain's mate on the Royal Yacht HMY Victoria and Albert (1855)

There are 19 Commonwealth naval personnel burials of the 1914–1918 war and two from the 1939–1945 war.

In 1926 the Pleasaunce was sold to the Metropolitan Borough of Greenwich, the Admiralty reserving rights of further burials. Railings around the tombstones were removed and part of the ground was landscaped as a park.

Today, the Pleasaunce has a small children's playground (installed in 2001), a community centre (The Bridge, formerly the under-5s One O'clock Club run by Royal Borough of Greenwich), a cafeteria and a small war memorial.

References

External links
 
 Friends of East Greenwich Pleasaunce

1857 establishments in England
Parks and open spaces in the Royal Borough of Greenwich
Cemeteries in London
Commonwealth War Graves Commission cemeteries in England